Kaye Hallam (born 24 March 1957) is an Australian former professional tennis player.

Hallam grew up in the New South Wales town of Wagga Wagga and competed on the professional tour in the 1970s. She was a doubles quarter-finalist at the 1976 Australian Open, partnering Renee Blount. Her best singles performance was a second round appearance in the December edition of the 1977 Australian Open.

References

External links
 
 

1957 births
Living people
Australian female tennis players
Tennis people from New South Wales
Sportspeople from Wagga Wagga